Alfred Stone (12 February 1840, Bristol –  3 January 1878, Stoke Bishop) was an English musician, choir-trainer, composer, and Church of England organist.

Biography
Alfred Stone was educated at the Bristol city school (Queen Elizabeth's Hospital) and studied under John David Corfe, organist of Bristol Cathedral. Stone briefly worked at a soap works in Bristol and then in 1858 became a professional organist at St. Paul's Church, Clifton, and in 1862 at Arley chapel. He was an organist and choir-trainer from 1863 to 1869 at Highbury Congregational chapel, from 1869 to 1875 at St. Paul's Church, Clifton, from 1875 to 1878 at Christ Church, Clifton Down, and from 1873 to 1878 at the Lord Mayor's chapel, St. Mark's Church, Bristol.

Stone adopted the tonic sol-fa system for teaching and held a number of tutorial appointments, including one at the Bristol Asylum for the Blind from 1876 to 1878. In 1873 the Bristol Musical Festival was established with Stone as choirmaster, secretary, and manager. He died suddenly and unexpectedly in 1878, leaving a widow and children. He was buried at Arnos Vale Cemetery.

Selected publications
 (first published by Novello in 1881)

References

1840 births
1878 deaths
English organists
19th-century English musicians
English composers
Musicians from Bristol
19th-century organists